Chŏngju (also Jŏngju) is a si, or city, in southern North P'yŏngan province, North Korea.  Prior to 1994, it was designated as a kun or county. The terrain is mostly level, but mountainous in the north. To the south lies the Chŏngju Plain, where the hills do not rise above . Chŏngju also includes approximately 10 islands in the Yellow Sea.

Geography
Some 40 percent of Chŏngju is covered by coniferous forestland.

Administrative divisions
Chŏngju is divided into 14 tong (neighbourhoods) and 18 ri (villages):

Economy
Local agriculture is dominated by orcharding and rice farming; the chestnuts of this region are especially famous.

Transportation
The city is served by both road and rail; it is the junction point of the P'yŏngŭi and P'yŏngbuk lines of the Korean State Railway.

Politics
In February 2011, the city and others in North P'yŏngan had rare protests, of a few score of people, calling for adequate provision of rice and power. At the time, news of the Arab Spring was spreading via Chinese TV channels and phone calls with defectors.

Notable people
Baek Seok
Hong Yun-suk
Kim Ok
Ki-baik Lee
Sun Myung Moon
Pang Chol-mi
Yi Kwang-su
T.K. Seung

See also

Geography of North Korea
Administrative divisions of North Korea
 List of cities in North Korea
North Pyongan
Battle of Chongju (1950)
Chongju Chongnyon station

References

Further reading
Dormels, Rainer. North Korea's Cities: Industrial facilities, internal structures and typification. Jimoondang, 2014.

External links

City profile of Jongju

Cities in North Pyongan